Hair washing without commercial shampoo or no poo (short for no shampoo) is a collective term for methods of washing hair without commercial shampoo.

Rationale
Proponents of "no poo" claim that there is no medical reason for humans to wash their hair with synthetic shampoos—introduced in the 1930s, with daily shampooing becoming the norm in the US by the 1970s and 1980s. They believe that washing practices are determined by cultural norms and individual preferences, with some people washing daily, some fortnightly, and some not at all. From a clinical point of view, "the main purpose for a shampoo is to cleanse the scalp", though "most patients would disagree[,] stating that the purpose of shampoo is to beautify the hair".

They also believe that shampoo removes the natural oils (sebum) produced by the scalp and that, in return, the scalp produces more oil to compensate, creating a vicious circle whereby more frequent shampooing is necessary to remove increasingly excess oils. Proponents believe that it typically takes two to six weeks to break the cycle after adopting "no poo" practices. The belief that the scalp detects loss of sebum and produces more to compensate is unsubstantiated by current science.

Other "no poo" proponents avoid shampoos because their ingredients such as sodium lauryl sulfate can be irritants.

Cost is a reason some people decide to use "no poo" techniques instead of commercial hair care products.

Methods
The purest form of "no poo" adoption is to use only water to wash hair, however there are other approaches possible by people wishing to avoid oil-stripping substances and chemicals that they consider unnecessary for the maintenance of their hair. Methods for washing hair without shampoo include washing with dissolved baking soda followed by an acidic rinse such as diluted vinegar, Also honey and various oils (such as coconut oil) can be used. Japanese traditional hair cleansing is with seaweed powder.

Following a 2007 radio interview that Australian Richard Glover held with Matthew Parris (a Times columnist "who hadn't shampooed for more than a decade"), Glover "decided to challenge his audience to go without shampoo for six weeks". Of the over 500 participants in the challenge, 86 percent reported that "their hair was either better or the same" following the challenge.

Dermatologist Jim Leyden tried an experiment of paying prisoners not to wash their hair for a month to determine whether they developed dandruff—and found that they did not.

See also
 Curly Girl Method
 Hair care
 Hair washing
 Hygiene hypothesis

References

Hairdressing
Shampoos
Human hair
Scalp
Pseudoscience